Sara Maliqi (born 9 October 1995) is a Kosovan-born Albanian footballer who plays as a defender and has appeared for the Albania women's national team.

Career
Maliqi has been capped for the Albania national team, appearing for the team during the 2019 FIFA Women's World Cup qualifying cycle.

See also
List of Albania women's international footballers

References

External links
 
 
 

1995 births
Living people
Albanian women's footballers
Women's association football defenders
KFF Vllaznia Shkodër players
Albania women's international footballers
People from Kaçanik
Kosovan women's footballers
Kosovan people of Albanian descent
Sportspeople of Albanian descent